Inadmissible Evidence is a play written by John Osborne in 1964. It was also filmed in 1968.

Description
The protagonist of the play is William Maitland, a 39-year-old English solicitor who has come to hate his entire life. Much of the play consists of lengthy monologues in which Maitland tells the audience about his life, a life he now regards as an utter failure. He readily acknowledges that he is bored with his wife and children, and just as bored by the petty, meaningless love affairs he's been carrying on with other women. His career revolves around sordid divorce cases, and he's come to despise both his clients and his colleagues. Maitland drinks heavily, and enjoys bullying and insulting everyone he comes into contact with.

In Act One, like a prosecutor presenting a case, Maitland brutally shows the audience the utter despair and mediocrity of his life. In Act Two, Maitland's crimes receive their due punishment, as he is deserted by everyone he ever cared about, including his clerk, his mistress and his wife. At times the play uses the technique of intercut monologues, which are arranged like dialogue but involve no communication between the characters.

The role of Maitland was created by Nicol Williamson who played the role in Anthony Page's original Royal Court production, in its 1965 Broadway debut, and in the 1968 movie version. In 1965 the play transferred to Wyndham's Theatre in London's West End. Williamson played Maitland, with John Hurt as Jones, Cyril Raymond as Hudson, Clare Kelly as Joy, and Eleanor Fazan as Liz.  In spring 1981, he and original director Anthony Page revived the play for a six-week engagement at the Roundabout Theatre (23rd Street) in New York, fifteen years after the original Broadway run.

Original Royal Court cast
Jones - John Quentin
Bill Maitland - Nicol Williamson
Hudson - Arthur Lowe
Shirley - Ann Beach
Joy - Lois Daine
Mrs. Garnsey - Clare Kelly
Jane Maitland - Natasha Pyne
Liz - Sheila Allen

Film adaptation

In 1968 the play was made into a film by the play's director Anthony Page, and starring Nicol Williamson, Eleanor Fazan and Jill Bennett.

References

External links
 
 Performances in Theatre Archive, University of Bristol
 

1964 plays
Broadway plays
Plays by John Osborne
British plays adapted into films